is a Japanese footballer currently playing as a midfielder for Oita Trinita.

Club career
Yasuda made his professional debut for Oita Trinita in a 2–1 Emperor's Cup win against Thespakusatsu Gunma.

Career statistics

Club
.

Notes

References

External links

2005 births
Living people
Association football people from Fukuoka Prefecture
Japanese footballers
Association football midfielders
Oita Trinita players